Francisco Meneses Osorio (1630–1705) was a Spanish painter.

Osorio was born in Seville, and is thought to have died there.  Very little is known of his life. He was a pupil and imitator of Murillo, and it has been suggested that some of the works attributed to the latter were painted by Osorio. We know that he was regarded by Murillo as his friend, that he was a close acquaintance of Juan Garzon, with whom he worked; that he was at one time secretary and later on president of the Academy of Sevillo, and that while in that city he had a high reputation. This reputation, it is said, was somewhat discounted after his death, because it was considered that some of his copies of Murillo's works were so accurate that he should have signed the master's name. It was in fact suggested that two of his copies had been accepted as genuine works by Murillo. On the other hand, these statements are declared by one Spanish author to have been made only with a view of discrediting Osorio. He and Murillo are said to have worked together in the Capuchin church in Cadiz.

His principal work was painted for the church of Saint Martin at Madrid, and represents the Prophet Elijah. There are pictures by him in the museums in Cadiz and Seville, the latter dealing with the Order of St. Francis. A work representing St Catherine, which is preserved in Cadiz, is said to have had a special devotion for St. Philip Neri, and to have been buried in the church dedicated to that saint.

References

External links
Biography at the Wallace Collection
Assumption of the Virgin in the Courtauld Institute, London

1630 births
1705 deaths
Painters from Seville